Abraham Josue Toro (born December 20, 1996) is a Canadian professional baseball third baseman for the Milwaukee Brewers of Major League Baseball (MLB). He has previously played in MLB for the Houston Astros and Seattle Mariners. He was selected by the Astros in the fifth round of the 2016 Major League Baseball draft and made his MLB debut for them in 2019. He was traded to the Mariners during the 2021 season and to the Brewers after the 2022 season.

Amateur career
Toro attended Polyvalente Édouard-Montpetit High School and Vanier College in Montreal. He then attended Seminole State College in Seminole, Oklahoma. In 2016, his only season at Seminole, he hit .439 with 20 home runs and 86 RBIs over 55 games. After the year, he was drafted by the Houston Astros in the fifth round of the 2016 Major League Baseball draft.

Professional career

Houston Astros
Toro signed with the Astros and made his professional debut with the Greeneville Astros, batting .254 with 19 RBIs in 44 games. He began 2017 with the Tri-City ValleyCats before being promoted to the Quad Cities River Bandits in late July. In 69 games between the two clubs, he hit .246 with 15 home runs and 33 RBIs. In 2018, he began the year with the Buies Creek Astros, with whom he was named a Carolina League All-Star, and was promoted to the Corpus Christi Hooks in July; for the season, Toro slashed .247/.345/.435 with 16 home runs and 78 RBIs in 133 games. After the season, he played in the Arizona Fall League. He returned to Corpus Christi to begin 2019, earning Texas League All-Star honors. After slashing .306/.393/.513 with 16 home runs and seventy RBIs over 98 games, Toro was promoted to the Round Rock Express, and hit .424/.506/.606 with one home run and ten RBIs over 16 games for them.

On August 22, 2019, the Astros selected Toro's contract and promoted him to the major leagues. He made his major league debut that night versus the Detroit Tigers, playing third base and going 0-for-4. On September 1, Toro played his second game in his home country of Canada. In the top of the ninth inning, he hit a two-out, two-run home run to break a 0–0 tie. In the bottom of the inning, he fielded the final out of the game, thus completing Justin Verlander’s third no-hitter. For Houston in 2019, Toro hit .218/.303/.385/.688 with two home runs and nine RBIs over 25 games.  Over a shortened 2020 season with the Astros, he batted .149/.237/.276 with 13 runs, three home runs, and nine RBIs over 87 at bats, and was hit by a pitch seven times, tied for fourth in the American League. In 35 games for the Astros in 2021, Toro slashed .211/.287/.385 with six home runs and 20 RBIs. He hit a home run in each of his last two games with Houston.

Seattle Mariners
On July 27, 2021, the Astros traded Toro, along with relief pitcher Joe Smith, to the Seattle Mariners in exchange for Rafael Montero and Kendall Graveman. The two teams were in the midst of a series against each other, and Toro was informed of the news as he was taking batting practice for Houston. After learning he had been traded, he went to the Seattle dugout, put on his new uniform, and resumed warming up. In the ninth inning of that night's game, Toro was put in as a pinch hitter and hit a two-run home run to right field against Ryan Pressly, making him the first player in MLB history to homer for a team and against the same team in consecutive games. The next day, Toro homered for the fourth straight game.

On August 31, 2021, with the Mariners again facing the Astros, Toro came to bat against Graveman in the eighth inning of a scoreless game with the bases loaded, and, on the eighth pitch of the at-bat, hit a 413-foot home run to right-center field for his first career grand slam. The homer accounted for all the runs scored in a Mariners win and put the team 3.5 games out of the second wild card playoff seed with 29 games left. Toro finished the 2021 season with a batting average of .239, 11 home runs, and 46 RBIs (all career highs). With the Mariners, he posted a slash line of .252/.328/.367, hit five home runs, scored 28 runs, and drove in 26.

Toro began the 2022 season with the Mariners as a part-time utility player. On May 21, he collided with right fielder Adam Frazier and suffered a left shoulder sprain, resulting in a trip to injured list for Toro. He was activated on June 1. Despite having late, clutch hits against the Baltimore Orioles, Oakland Athletics, and Houston Astros, Toro was sent to the minor leagues on August 6, opening up a roster spot for Mitch Haniger to return from injury. Toro was recalled on August 30, and a day later hit a 403-foot long go-ahead home run against the Detroit Tigers in a win which put the Mariners a season-high 14 games over .500.

Milwaukee Brewers
On December 2, 2022, the Mariners traded Toro and Jesse Winker to the Milwaukee Brewers for Kolten Wong.

On January 13, 2023, Toro agreed to a one-year, $1.25 million contract with the Brewers, avoiding salary arbitration.

Personal life
Toro is of French-Canadian and Venezuelan descent. He is fluent in English, Spanish, and French.

References

External links

1996 births
Living people
Sportspeople from Longueuil
Baseball people from Quebec
Canadian expatriate baseball players in the United States
Canadian people of Venezuelan descent
French Quebecers
Major League Baseball players from Canada
Major League Baseball third basemen
Houston Astros players
Seattle Mariners players
Seminole State Trojans baseball players
Greeneville Astros players
Tri-City ValleyCats players
Quad Cities River Bandits players
Buies Creek Astros players
Corpus Christi Hooks players
Scottsdale Scorpions players
Round Rock Express players
Sugar Land Skeeters players
Everett AquaSox players
2023 World Baseball Classic players